

Oberalpsee is a lake just below Oberalp Pass on the side of the Canton of Uri in Switzerland.

See also
List of mountain lakes of Switzerland

External links

Lakes of Switzerland
Lakes of the canton of Uri